This is a list of notable alumni of Shippensburg University in Shippensburg Township, Cumberland County, Pennsylvania.

Athletics

Government

Entertainment and media 
Jonathan Koch, producer
John Hamilton, actor
Chris Raab a.k.a. "Raab Himself", television personality
Lil Skies, hip hop artist

Military

Literature 
Jessica James, historical fiction author
Justin Jordan, comics writer
Dean Koontz, author & New York Times Best Seller

Business and education 
Michele Buck, chairman, president and CEO, The Hershey Company 
Candace Introcaso, president, La Roche College 
Tom Jackson Jr., Ph.D., president, California State Polytechnic University, Humboldt 
Samuel A. Kirkpatrick, president emeritus of The University of Texas at San Antonio
William E. Klunk, renowned American psychiatrist and Alzheimer's researcher at the University of Pittsburgh
Jesús E. Maldonado, American geneticist at the Smithsonian Institution
Kevin J. Manning, Ph.D., president, Stevenson University

References

Shippensburg University of Pennsylvania alumni
Shippensburg